The Slash Years is the first best of album released by rock band L7.  It comprises L7's greatest hits released on Slash Records. It would be the band's final release until Scatter the Rats was released in 2019. A 3 CD box set with the similar name Wargasm – The Slash Years was released in 2021.

Track listing

Songs 1-4 appear on Bricks Are Heavy (1992)
Songs 5-8 appear on Hungry for Stink (1994)
Songs 9-12 appear on The Beauty Process: Triple Platinum (1997)

References

L7 (band) albums
Albums produced by Butch Vig
2000 greatest hits albums
Grunge compilation albums
Slash Records compilation albums